WBTA (1490 AM) is a radio station broadcasting a soft adult contemporary format. Licensed to Batavia, New York, United States, the station is the only one directly serving Genesee County and in general serves the area between Rochester and Buffalo.  The station is owned by HPL Communications, Inc. It was broadcasting ABC Music Radio's "Timeless" format (and, before 2006, its predecessor "Unforgettable Favorites"), but as of February 13, 2010; the current format is aired locally.

Wayne Fuller was a longtime personality at the station, working there from 1967 until shortly before his death in 2018. Morning host Jerry Warner died a few months later.

References

External links
Official Website

BTA
Soft adult contemporary radio stations in the United States
Radio stations established in 1957